Galba (3 BC – AD 69) was Roman emperor for seven months from 68 to 69.

Galba may also refer to:

People 
 Sulpicius Galba (disambiguation), ancient Romans
 Galba (Suessiones), king of the Belgic tribe Suessiones during Julius Caesar's conquest of Gaul
 Karol Galba (1921–2009), Slovak football referee
 Martí Joan de Galba (died 1490), Catalan writer
 Sir Galba (1919–1957), Grenadian singer

Place and jurisdictions 
 Ancient Castra Galbae (or Castra Galbæ), presumably named after one of the above
 Hamlet in Cobargo, Australia

Animals 
 Spialia galba, a species of butterfly
 Luthrodes galba, a butterfly
 Galba (butterfly), an invalid genus of butterflies in the family Lycaenidae
 Galba (gastropod), a genus of freshwater gastropod in the family Lymnaeidae

Other uses 
 Galba (automobile), a French cyclecar from 1929

See also

 Gramm–Leach–Bliley Act (GLBA; Financial Services Modernization Act of 1999) U.S. federal law
 Gabla (disambiguation)